"Nephew" is a song by American rapper Smokepurpp featuring  fellow American rapper Lil Pump. It was released on July 27, 2018. The track peaked at number five on the Bubbling Under Hot 100 chart and at number 96 on the Canadian Hot 100.

Music video 
The music video for the track was released on August 6, 2018. The video was directed by Millicent Hailes. Lil Pump spoke about the video in an interview with Billboard during the 2018 MTV Video Music Awards, saying the video was "lit", adding "I was excited. That shit's fire".

Critical reception 
The track received generally positive reviews. Kevin Goddard of HotNewHipHop called the track "bass-heavy" and called the track "very hot".

Dance challenge 
On August 10, 2018, Smokepurpp and Lil Pump started a dance challenge for the song, which was described by Trevor Smith of HotNewHipHop as "the Macarena performed by someone who can't quite remember how to do the Macarena", calling it "actually the perfect way to move to a Pump and Purpp track".

Charts

Certifications

References 

2018 singles
2018 songs
Lil Pump songs
Songs written by Lil Pump
Smokepurpp songs
Songs written by Smokepurpp